Mahnke is a surname. Notable people with the surname include:

 Claudia Mahnke, German mezzo-soprano
 Dietrich Mahnke (1884–1939), German philosopher and historian of mathematics
 Doug Mahnke, American comic book artist and penciller

See also
 Mahnke House, a historical residential building located in Des Moines, Iowa, United States